Durant is a surname of French and English origin. It ultimately derives from the Latin omen name Durandus, meaning "enduring". Notable people with the surname include:

Adrian Durant (born 1984), sprint athlete from the U.S. Virgin Islands
Albert Durant (1892–?), Belgian water polo player
Ariel Durant (1898–1981), co-author of The Story of Civilization with husband Will Durant
Cliff Durant (1890–1937), American racecar driver
Cobie Durant (born 1998), American football player
Darian Durant (born 1982), CFL football player
Don Durant (1932–2005), American actor and singer
George Durant (1632–1692), Attorney General from North Carolina
Henry Durant (1802–1875), first president of the University of California
Henry Bickersteth Durant (1871–1932), Bishop of Lahore (1913–32)
Henry Fowle Durant (1822–1881), American lawyer and philanthropist
Hugh Durant (1877–1916), British sport shooter
Isabelle Durant (born 1954), Belgian politician
Joanne Durant (born 1975), Barbadian track and field sprinter
Joe Durant (born 1964), American professional golfer
John Charles Durant (1846–1929), English printer and Liberal politician
Justin Durant (born 1985), NFL football player
Kenneth W. Durant (1919–1942), U.S. Navy sailor
Kevin Durant (born 1988), American basketball player
Louis Durant (1910–1972), American racecar driver
Mataeo Durant (born 1999), American football player
Michael Durant (born 1961), U.S. Army helicopter pilot held prisoner in Somalia in 1993
Mike Durant (baseball) (born 1969), former American Major League baseball player
Paul Durant (born 1959), former American racecar driver
Peter Durant, American politician
Sam Durant (born 1961), American artist
Susan Durant (1827–1873), British artist and sculptor
Tara Durant (born 1972), American politician
Thomas C. Durant (1820–1885), American financier
Tony Durant (born 1928), British politician
Will Durant (1885–1981), American philosopher, historian and author, husband of Ariel Durant
William A. Durant (1866–1948), American politician
William C. Durant (1861–1947), pioneer of U.S. automobile industry
William West Durant (1850–1934), American architect and designer
Yasir Durant (born 1997), American football player

See also
Durrant, surname
Durante, given name and surname
Durand (surname)

References

English-language surnames
French-language surnames
Surnames from nicknames